Written on the Heart is a 2011 play by the British playwright David Edgar. It was premiered by the Royal Shakespeare Company at the Swan Theatre from 27 October 2011 to 10 March 2012, to mark the four-hundredth anniversary of the King James Bible – it draws its title from the translation of Jeremiah 31.33 in that translation and deals with William Tyndale's and Lancelot Andrewes's involvement in biblical translation.

It opened for a London run at the Duchess Theatre on 19 April – originally scheduled to run until 21 July 2012, it closed early on 19 May.

Original cast and creative

External links

Written on the Heart – RSC homepage
Article on the play by Greg Doran – March 21, 2011

2011 plays
Plays set in the 17th century
Plays set in England
400th anniversary of the King James Version
Plays by David Edgar